Fiddlin’ Around (alternately titled Just Mickey) is a 1930 animated short film produced by Walt Disney Productions and released by Columbia Pictures as part of the Mickey Mouse film series. It was the sixteenth Mickey Mouse short to be produced, the first of that year.

The film is a one-person show with Mickey Mouse playing a violin on stage; Mickey is the only character to appear in the film, apart from the unseen audience and an equally unseen heckler. It was directed by Walt Disney and is the first Mickey cartoon not animated by Ub Iwerks.

Plot
Curtains part, and Mickey Mouse enters a stage, with his violin, to a more or less receptive audience. Mickey plays Traumerei and the Hungarian Dance no. 5, until he is overwhelmed by emotions and leaves the stage. The audience cheers, the mouse re-enters, and as an encore plays the last measure of the William Tell overture; mockingly laughed at by one particular heckler, he nonetheless plays the piece to great success despite breaking his instrument and bow in half in the process. Then Mickey is crushed by the curtains.

Title
An issue concerning this cartoon is whether the title of the short is Fiddling Around, Fiddlin' Around or Just Mickey. Leonard Maltin writes that the cartoon was copyrighted as Fiddlin' Around, and this was seen on the original theatrical poster, while Just Mickey is its common title and was shown on the recreated title card seen on the 2004 Walt Disney Treasures DVD release Mickey Mouse In Black And White: Volume 2, as no original release print with the title had yet surfaced.

In 2009, David Gerstein uncovered an original 1930 release print which shows Fiddling Around, implying that Just Mickey was a working title.

In the 2018 book Mickey Mouse: The Ultimate History, Gerstein was more definitive: "Many latter-day reference sources have identified this film by its working title, Just Mickey, which was used in some pre-release Powers advertising. In fact, however, the final title -- under which the film was copyrighted, distributed by Columbia, advertised, and exhibited -- is Fiddling Around."

Reception
In Mickey's Movies: The Theatrical Films of Mickey Mouse, Gijs Grob observes, "Like other early Mickey cartoons, Just Mickey is more about making music than about plot. But the short features one of Mickey's greatest early concert performances, and it contains some good facial expression animation of Mickey... Moreover, the hand movements in this short are remarkably convincing. Just Mickey is an early showcase of Walt Disney's ambition to improve the art of animation. Being the first Mickey Mouse cartoon after Ub Iwerks' departure in January 1930, it shows the studio could do very well without him."

On the Disney Film Project, Ryan Kirkpatrick agrees: "The thing that keeps your interest... are the expressions on Mickey's face. He goes from annoyance at a heckler, to passion for his playing to happiness at a job well done from moment to moment, with natural transitions, not just jumping from expression to expression... I can imagine the animators took this as a challenge to create a new range of expressions and emotions through Mickey."

The Film Daily (June 8, 1930): "Good Cartoon: As a violin virtuoso, Mickey Mouse has plenty of trouble with broken strings and a tough audience that includes one guy who keeps giving him the horse laugh. But Mickey's acrobatic manipulation of his instrument, with which he promotes plenty of comedy as well as music, puts him over for an encore. A very good comedy of its kind."

Motion Picture News (June 21, 1930): "Fair: There is very little action in this Mickey Mouse cartoon, most of it being devoted to close-ups of Mickey playing classical music on a trick violin. The clever cartoon work, however, makes up for the deficiency in ideas and Mickey's shadow, thrown upon the backdrop by the spotlight, moves in unison with him, giving an effect of depth unusual in cartoons."

Variety (July 9, 1930): "One of the Mickey Mouse series and okay for filler. It's a Walt Disney creation and gets most its novelty from fact that Mickey Mouse does a single for a change. He gets the break from sulting action to music or vice versa with appropriate sounds and gestures. Mickey trots into view for a violin solo and shakes, squirms, acrobats, weeps and otherwise accents his playing. Audience unseen gives him a couple of Bronx cheers to help the situation and Mickey bows out on his back, but still playing the fiddle."

Home media
The short was released on December 7, 2004 on Walt Disney Treasures: Mickey Mouse in Black and White, Volume Two: 1929-1935 under its working title, Just Mickey.

See also
Mickey Mouse (film series)

References

External links
 

1930 films
1930 animated films
1930s Disney animated short films
Mickey Mouse short films
Films directed by Walt Disney
Films produced by Walt Disney
Animated films about music and musicians
American black-and-white films
Columbia Pictures short films
Columbia Pictures animated short films
1930s American films